Soubrebost is a commune in the Creuse department in the Nouvelle-Aquitaine region in central France.

Geography

Population

Personalities
 Martin Nadaud, politician, was born 17 November 1815 in the hamlet of La Martinèche and died there on 28 December 1898.

Sights
 The church, dating from the thirteenth century, which houses a wooden statue of the same period.

See also
Communes of the Creuse department

References

Communes of Creuse